The Borneo thrush (Turdus poliocephalus seebohmi), also known as the mountain blackbird or locally in Dusun as Luhui tana, is a bird in the thrush family.  It is a subspecies of the island thrush (Turdus poliocephalus) endemic to the island of Borneo.

Description
The Borneo thrush is mainly dark brown in colour.  The flanks, lower breast and belly are rufous, with a white vent.  It is about 23 cm in length.  Its bill, eye-ring and legs are deep yellow.  Males and females are similar in size and appearance.

Distribution and habitat
The subspecies is found only on the higher levels of Mount Kinabalu (4095 m), normally from about 2100 m asl upwards to the limits of vegetation, as well as around the summits of Mount Trus Madi (2642 m) and Mount Tambuyukon (2579 m), all of which lie in the state of Sabah, Malaysia.  The habitat ranges from cold, wet and mossy montane forest up to, on Kinabalu, almost bare rock at about 3200 m asl.

Behaviour

Breeding
The nest is described as being a substantial structure, made of woven plant material and lined with grass, 15 cm across by 10 cm deep.  It is built a few metres above the ground in a fork or the branches of the low trees found at the altitude at which it lives.  The normal clutch is a single egg.  Nests with eggs or chicks have been recorded in February and March, suggesting a restricted breeding season.

Feeding
The birds forage through the forest in the trees and on the ground.  The diet is largely vegetarian, mainly fruit and berries, though insects are also taken.

Voice
A loud melodious song and rattling alarm calls have been recorded.

Notes

References
 Davison, Geoffrey W.H.; & Gale, John. (1992). Birds of Mount Kinabalu, Borneo. Natural History Publications (Borneo): Kota Kinabalu; and Koktas Sabah Berhad: Ranau, Sabah, Malaysia. 
 Smythies, B.E.; & Davison, G.W.H. (1999). The Birds of Borneo. Natural History Publications (Borneo) in association with the Sabah Society: Kota Kinabalu. 

Borneo thrush
Birds of East Malaysia
Endemic fauna of Malaysia
Endemic birds of Borneo
Borneo thrush
Fauna of the Borneo montane rain forests
Mount Kinabalu